Condorodon is a genus of extinct mammals from the Lower Jurassic Cañadón Asfalto Formation of the Cañadón Asfalto Basin in Patagonia, Argentina. The type species is C. spanios, described by Gaetano and Rougier in 2012.

Classification 
One of the only two known South American eutriconodonts, Condorodon differs from the somewhat older Argentoconodon, a relative of Volaticotherium, in the morphology of the molariform teeth. It is closely related to the Late Jurassic amphilesthere Tendagurodon from the Tendaguru Formation of Tanzania, Africa.

References 

Toarcian life
Jurassic mammals of South America
Middle Jurassic tetrapods of South America
Jurassic Argentina
Fossils of Argentina
Cañadón Asfalto Formation
Fossil taxa described in 2012
Taxa named by Leandro Gaetano
Taxa named by Guillermo W. Rougier
Prehistoric mammal genera